The arrondissement of Briançon is an arrondissement of France in the Hautes-Alpes department in the Provence-Alpes-Côte d'Azur region. It has 36 communes.

Composition

The communes of the arrondissement of Briançon, and their INSEE codes, are:

 Abriès-Ristolas (05001)
 Aiguilles (05003)
 L'Argentière-la-Bessée (05006)
 Arvieux (05007)
 Briançon (05023)
 Ceillac (05026)
 Cervières (05027)
 Champcella (05031)
 Château-Ville-Vieille (05038)
 Eygliers (05052)
 Freissinières (05058)
 La Grave (05063)
 Guillestre (05065)
 Molines-en-Queyras (05077)
 Le Monêtier-les-Bains (05079)
 Mont-Dauphin (05082)
 Montgenèvre (05085)
 Névache (05093)
 Puy-Saint-André (05107)
 Puy-Saint-Pierre (05109)
 Puy-Saint-Vincent (05110)
 Réotier (05116)
 Risoul (05119)
 La Roche-de-Rame (05122)
 Saint-Chaffrey (05133)
 Saint-Clément-sur-Durance (05134)
 Saint-Crépin (05136)
 Saint-Martin-de-Queyrières (05151)
 Saint-Véran (05157)
 La Salle-les-Alpes (05161)
 Val-des-Prés (05174)
 Vallouise-Pelvoux (05101)
 Vars (05177)
 Les Vigneaux (05180)
 Villar-d'Arêne (05181)
 Villar-Saint-Pancrace (05183)

History

The arrondissement of Briançon was created in 1800.

As a result of the reorganisation of the cantons of France which came into effect in 2015, the borders of the cantons are no longer related to the borders of the arrondissements. The cantons of the arrondissement of Briançon were, as of January 2015:

 Aiguilles
 L'Argentière-la-Bessée
 Briançon-Nord
 Briançon-Sud
 La Grave
 Guillestre
 Le Monêtier-les-Bains

References

Briancon